This is a list of former sports teams from the US state of Florida:

Baseball

Major Leagues

Negro leagues
Jacksonville Red Caps

Minor League Baseball

Florida State League
Bradenton Growers (1919–1920, 1923–1924, 1926)
Cocoa Indians (1951–1958)
Cocoa Astros (1965–1972)
Daytona Beach Admirals (1987)
Daytona Beach Astros (1978–1984)
Daytona Beach Dodgers (1968–1973)
Daytona Beach Islanders (1920–1924, 1936–1941, 1946–1966, 1977, 1985–1986)
Deerfield Beach Sun Sox (1966)
DeLand Reds (1936–1938)
DeLand Red Hats (1939–1941, 1946–1954)
DeLand Sun Caps (1970)
Fort Lauderdale Yankees (1962–1992)
Fort Lauderdale Red Sox (1993)
Fort Myers Royals (1978–1988)
Gainesville G-Men (1936–1941, 1946–1952, 1955–1958)
Jacksonville Beach Sea Birds (1951–1954)
Key West Padres (1969)
Key West Sun Caps (1971)
Key West Conchs (1972–1974)
Key West Cubs (1975)
Kissimmee Cobras (1995–2000)
Lakeland Pilots (1953–1955)
Lakeland Indians (1960)
Lakeland Giants (1962)
Lakeland Tigers (1963–1964, 1967–2006)
Leesburg Gondoliers (1937–1938)
Leesburg Anglers (1939–1941, 1946)
Leesburg Pirates (1947–1948)
Leesburg Dodgers (1949)
Leesburg Packers (1950–1952)
Leesburg Lakers (1953)
Leesburg Braves (1956–1957)
Leesburg Orioles (1960–1961)
Leesburg Athletics (1965–1968)
Miami Marlins (1962–70)
Miami Marlins (1982–88)
Miami Orioles (1971–1981)
Miami Miracle (1989–1991)
Ocala Yearlings (1940–1941)
Orlando Gulls (1937)
Orlando Senators (1938–1941, 1946–1953)
Orlando C.B.'s (1954–1955)
Orlando Seratomas (1956)
Orlando Flyers (1957–1958)
Orlando Dodgers (1959–1961)
Orlando Twins (1963–1972)
Osceola Astros (1985–1994)
Palatka Azaleas (1936–1939, 1946–1953)
Palatka Tigers (1956)
Palatka Redlegs (1957–1961)
Palatka Cubs (1962)
Pompano Beach Mets (1969–1973)
Pompano Beach Cubs (1976–1978)
Port Charlotte Rangers (1987–2002)
Sanford Lookouts (1936–1939)
Sanford Seminoles (1940–1941, 1947)
Sanford Celeryfeds (1946)
Sanford Giants (1949–1951)
Sanford Seminole Blues (1952)
Sanford Cardinals (1953, 1955)
Sanford Greyhounds (1959–1960)
Sarasota Sun Sox (1961–1965)
Sarasota White Sox (1989–1993)
Sarasota Red Sox (1994–2004)
St. Augustine Saints (1936–1941, 1946–1950, 1952)
St. Petersburg Saints (1955–1965)
St. Petersburg Cardinals (1966–1996)
Tampa Tarpons (1931–1942) (1946–1987)
Tampa White Sox (1988)
Vero Beach Dodgers (1980–2006)
West Palm Beach Sheriffs (1928)
West Palm Beach Indians (1955)
West Palm Beach Sun Chiefs (1956)
West Palm Beach Braves (1965–1968)
West Palm Beach Expos (1969–1997)
Winter Haven Sun Sox (1966)
Winter Haven Mets (1967)
Winter Haven Red Sox (1969–1992)

Florida East Coast League (1940–1942)
Cocoa Fliers (1941–1942)
DeLand Red Hats (1942)
Fort Lauderdale Tarpons (1940–1942)
Fort Pierce Bombers (1940–1942)
Hollywood Chiefs (1940)
Miami Beach Flamingos (1941–1942)
Miami Beach Tigers (1940)
Miami Seminoles (1942)
Miami Wahoos (1940–1941)
Orlando Nationals (1942)
West Palm Beach Indians (1940–1942)

Florida International League (1949–1954)
Fort Lauderdale Braves (1949–1951)
Fort Lauderdale Braves/Key West Conchs (1952)
Fort Lauderdale Lions (1953)
Lakeland Pilots (1949–1952)
Miami Beach Flamingos (1949–1952, 1954)
Miami Sun Sox (1949–1954)
St. Petersburg Saints (1949–1954)
Tallahassee Rebels (1954)
Tampa Smokers (1949–1954)
West Palm Beach Indians (1949–1954)

Senior Professional Baseball Association (1989–1990)
Bradenton Explorers, became Daytona Beach Explorers 
Fort Myers Sun Sox 
Gold Coast Suns
Orlando Juice 
St. Lucie Legends
St. Petersburg Pelicans
West Palm Beach Tropics 
Winter Haven Super Sox

Basketball

Men's

American Basketball Association (1967–1976)
Miami Floridians (1968–1972)

American Basketball Association (1999-Present)
Palm Beach Imperials (2006–2008)

Continental Basketball Association
Tampa Bay Thrillers (1984–1985) (1996–1997)
Sarasota Stingers (1983–1985)
Florida Stingers (1986–1987)

Global Basketball Association
Pensacola HotShots (1991–1993)

United States Basketball League
Brevard Blue Ducks (1988, 1990–04, as Jacksonville Hooters in 1988, 1990–92; as Daytona Beach Hooters in 1993; as Jacksonville Hooters in 1994; as Jacksonville Shooters in 1995; as Jacksonville Barracudas in 1996–98; as Gulf Coast SunDogs in 1999–00; as Lakeland Blue Ducks in 2001
Florida Sea Dragons (2000–2002) 
Tampa Bay Windjammers (1996–1999) 
Florida Sharks (1995–97)
Gold Coast Stingrays (1986)
West Palm Beach Stingrays (1987)
Palm Beach Stingrays (1988, 1990, 1992–1994)

World Basketball League
Florida Jades (1991–1992)
Jacksonville Stingrays (1992)

Women's

Women's National Basketball Association (WNBA)
Miami Sol (2000–2002) 
Orlando Miracle (1999–2002) — relocated to the Mohegan Sun casino and now playing as the Connecticut Sun

Football

Arena Football

American Indoor Football Association
Gulf Coast Raiders (2007)
Lakeland Thunderbolts (2005–2007)
Lakeland Thunderbolts (2006–2007)

Arena Football League (AFL)
Florida Bobcats (1996–2001)
Miami Vise (1987)
Miami Hooters (1993–1995)
Orlando Predators (1991-2016)

arenafootball2 (af2)
Florida Firecats (2001-2009)
Jacksonville Tomcats (2000–2002)
Pensacola Barracudas (2000–2002) 
Tallahassee Thunder (2000–2002)

American Professional Football League
Florida Scorpions (2008-2009, 2011)

National Indoor Football League
Daytona Beach Hawgs (2005)
Florida Frenzy (2005–2007)
Fort Myers Tarpons (2006–2007)
Kissimmee Kreatures (2005–2006)
Miami Vice Squad (2007)
Palm Beach Phantoms (2006)
Palm Beach Waves (2006–2007)
Port St. Lucie Mustangs (2007)
Tampa Tide (2007)

Southern Indoor Football League
Florida Kings (2009)

Ultimate Indoor Football League
Lakeland Raiders (2011-2015)
Miami Inferno (2013-2014)
Sarasota Thunder (2013)

X-League Indoor Football
Florida Marine Raiders (2011-2015)

World Indoor Football League
Daytona Beach Thunder (2005-2008)
Osceola Ghostriders (2007)

Conventional Football

All-America Football Conference (AAFC)
Miami Seahawks (1946)

Atlantic Coast Football League
Orlando Panthers (1970–71)

Continental Football League
Orlando Panthers (1965–1969)

Fall Experimental Football League
Florida Blacktips (2014-2016)

Professional Spring Football League
Tampa Bay Outlaws (1992)

Spring Football League
Miami Tropics (2000)

United Football League
Florida Tuskers (2009–2010)

United States Football League (USFL)
Jacksonville Bulls (1984–1985)
Orlando Renegades (1985)
Tampa Bay Bandits (1983–1985)

Women's American Football League
Jacksonville Dixie Blues (2001–2003)
Orlando Mayhem IWFL (2001–2003)
Orlando Fire (2001–2003)
Tampa Bay Force (2001–2003)

XFL
Orlando Rage (2000)

World Football League
Jacksonville Express (1975)
Jacksonville Sharks (1974)
Florida Blazers (1974), became San Antonio Wings, folded with the league in 1975

World League of American Football
Orlando Thunder (1991–1992)

Ice hockey

American Hockey League (AHL)
Jacksonville Barons (1973–1974)

Atlantic Coast Hockey League
Orlando Seals (2002–2004)

East Coast Hockey League/ECHL
Jacksonville Lizard Kings (1995–2000)
Miami Matadors (1998–1999)
Pensacola Ice Pilots (1996–2008)
Tallahassee Tiger Sharks (1994–2001)

International Hockey League (1945–2001)
Orlando Solar Bears (1995–2001)

Roller Hockey International
Florida Hammerheads (1993–1994)
Orlando Rollergators (1995)
Orlando Jackals (1996–1997)
Tampa Bay Tritons (1994)

Southern Elite Hockey League
Daytona Riptide 
Jacksonville Hammerheads  
Kissimmee Fury 
Space Coast Blast
Tampa Bay Ice Pirates

Southern Hockey League (1995–1996)
Lakeland Prowlers
Daytona Beach Breakers
West Palm Beach Barracudas  
Jacksonville Bullets

Southern Professional Hockey League
Florida Seals (2005–2007)
Jacksonville Barracudas (2002–2008)

Sunshine Hockey League (1992–1995)
Daytona Beach Sun Devils 
Jacksonville Bullets 
Lakeland Ice Warriors 
St. Petersburg Renegades 
West Palm Beach Blaze

Tropical Hockey League
Coral Gables Seminoles 
Miami Clippers 
Miami Beach Pirates

World Hockey Association 2
Jacksonville Barracudas (2002–2008)
Lakeland Loggerheads (2002–2004)
Orlando Seals (2002–2004)
Miami Manatees (2003–2004)

Soccer

Indoor

Eastern Indoor Soccer League
Pensacola Flyers (1998)
Tallahassee Scorpions (1997–1998)

Major Indoor Soccer League
Orlando Sharks (2007–2008)

National Professional Soccer League (1984–2001)
Florida ThunderCats (1998–1999) 
Jacksonville Generals (1988)
Tampa Bay Rowdies (1986–1987) 
Tampa Bay Terror (1995–1997)

United States Interregional Soccer League indoor
Brandon Braves (1994–1996)
Cocoa Expos (1993–1996)
Orlando Lions (1993–1996)

Outdoor

American Professional Soccer League
Fort Lauderdale Strikers (1990–1994)
Miami Freedom (1990–1992)
Orlando Lions (1990)
Tampa Bay Rowdies (1990–1993)

American Soccer League (1933–83)
Jacksonville Tea Men (1983)

American Soccer League (1988–89)
Fort Lauderdale Strikers (1988–1989)
Miami Sharks (1988–1989)
Orlando Lions (1988–1989)
Tampa Bay Rowdies (1988–1989)

Major League Soccer
Miami Fusion F.C. (1998–2001) 
Tampa Bay Mutiny (1996–2001)

North American Soccer League (1968–84)
Jacksonville Tea Men (1980–1982)
Miami Gatos (1972)
Miami Toros (1973–1976) 
Fort Lauderdale Strikers (1977–1983) 
Tampa Bay Rowdies (1975–1984)

North American Soccer League
Fort Lauderdale Strikers (2011–2016)

United States International Soccer League
Boca Raton Sabres (1992–1994)
Cocoa Expos (1994)
Coral Springs Kicks (1993)
Florida Stars (1994) 
Fort Lauderdale Kicks (1994) 
Jacksonville Fury (1994–1995) 
Orlando Lions (1992–1994)
South Florida Flamingos (1994)

United Soccer League (1984–85)
Fort Lauderdale Sun (1984–1985)
Jacksonville Tea Men (1984)

United Soccer Leagues
Orlando Lions (1992–1994)
Miami FC (2006–2009)

United Soccer Leagues First Division
Jacksonville Cyclones (1997–1999) 
Orlando Sundogs (1997)
Tampa Bay Cyclones (1996)

United Soccer Leagues Second Division
Daytona Tigers (1997)
Florida Stars (1995) 
Florida Strikers (1995, 1997)
Fort Lauderdale Strikers (1995)
Miami Breakers (1998) 
Orlando Nighthawks (1997–98)  
Pensacola Barracudas (1998) 
Tallahassee Tempest (1998) 
Tampa Bay Cyclones (1995)

USSF Division 2 Professional League
Miami FC (2010)

See also

List of defunct Georgia sports teams 
List of defunct Idaho sports teams 
List of defunct Mississippi sports teams 
List of defunct Ohio sports teams 
List of defunct Pennsylvania sports teams 
List of defunct Texas sports teams

 
Florida
Defunct teams